Terky may refer to:
 , or Terky, a Russian military stronghold on the North Caucasus Line (16–18 c.)

See also 
 Terki (disambiguation)
 Tersky (disambiguation)
 Turki (disambiguation)